Beatrix von Holte (1250 – 4 December 1327 in Essen) was the Abbess of Essen Abbey from 1292 until her death.

References 

 

Abbesses of Essen
People from Essen
1250 births
1327 deaths